Danish national road 11 is part of the Danish national road network. It runs along Jutland's west coast from Sæd at the German border to Aalborg.

Its year-round traffic ranged between 3,100 and 16,400 in 2008.

References 

Roads in Denmark